The Waco CG-13 was an American military transport glider aircraft developed during World War II.

Design and development
Wright Field Glider Branch realized a need for a glider larger than the CG-4A and requested designs. The response by several companies produced designs for five larger gliders. One of these designs was the XCG-13 by Waco Aircraft Company of Troy, Ohio.

The XCG-13 contract was for a 30-place design with an  useful load capacity to fly  at an altitude of  altitude. Flight testing of the prototype was performed at Clinton County Army Air Field and the type was approved on 10 March 1943. Testing found that a tricycle landing gear should be used, and that a hydraulic system be incorporated to open the top-hinged nose opening. These features were incorporated into the second XCG-13.

Ford Motor Company at Kingsford, Michigan and Northwestern Aeronautical at St. Paul, Minnesota built YCG-13 models  and were given contracts to build the production CG-13A. WACO was not given a production contract.  Northwestern Aeronautical built 49 production articles. Ford built 48 as 30 place and 37 as 42 place by adding a bench down the center of the cargo section. Between the two companies, 268 contracted articles were canceled in favor of producing more CG-4A gliders.

Operational history
The  stall speed was 19 mph higher than specified. One CG-13A was flown in combat in the Aparri Mission in the Philippines. The CG-13A gliders were not flown in combat in Europe but were used as transports in England and France.

Specifications (CG-13A)

See also

Operators

Royal Air Force
Airborne Forces Experimental Establishment - two CG-13As for trials in 1945.

United States Army Air Forces

References
 
Mondey, David, The Concise Guide to American Aircraft of World War II. London: Chancellor, 1996. I185152 706 0.SBN  
Silent Ones WWII Invasion Glider Test and Experiment Clinton County Army Air Field Wilmington Ohio

External links
Army Glider Can Carry A Fully Loaded Truck August 1944 article on CG-4A

Waco CG-13
1940s United States military gliders
CG-13
Aircraft first flown in 1943
High-wing aircraft